Ben More (meaning "great mountain") is the highest mountain and only Munro (mountains in Scotland that reach an elevation of  at least ) on the Isle of Mull, Scotland. It is also the highest peak in the Scottish isles – and the only Munro – apart from those on the Isle of Skye.

Access and climbing route
From the summit on a clear day, the view encompasses the Sound of Mull, Staffa, Ulva, the Ross of Mull and Iona in the distance. From sea loch to summit is approximately a four-hour walk.

From the  the route follows South West along a steep and rocky ridge first to the peak of  then on and up to Ben More itself. There is respite at the top in a circular refuge of stones. This route starts and ends on the B8035 road and is approximately a six-hour walk and scramble.

Climbers should be cautious when using a compass in misty conditions since there is magnetic rock in places, especially near the summit of the mountain.

Geology
Around 60 million years ago, the region was volcanically active, with Ben More being the remnant of a volcano, and it was in this period that the famous rock formations of Staffa and the basaltic columns of "The Castles" on Ulva came into being. They are particularly rich in silica.

See also
 Breast-shaped hill

References

External links

 Computer generated summit panoramas North South index

Munros
Marilyns of Scotland
Mountains and hills of the Scottish islands
Mountains and hills of Argyll and Bute
Landforms of the Isle of Mull
Volcanoes of Scotland
Paleocene volcanism
Extinct volcanoes